Marian Schaller (5 February 1904 – 8 May 1976) was a Polish footballer. He played in four matches for the Poland national football team from 1930 to 1934.

References

External links
 

1904 births
1976 deaths
Polish footballers
Poland international footballers
Place of birth missing
Association footballers not categorized by position